Desmond Baptiste (born 30 October 1949) is a Trinidadian cricketer. He played in 21 first-class and 3 List A matches for Trinidad and Tobago from 1968 to 1978.

See also
 List of Trinidadian representative cricketers

References

External links
 

1949 births
Living people
Trinidad and Tobago cricketers